Julia Waermer (Lepke, born 16 August 1989) is a German rower. She competed in the women's eight event at the 2012 Summer Olympics.

References

External links
 

1989 births
Living people
German female rowers
Olympic rowers of Germany
Rowers at the 2012 Summer Olympics
Rowers from Rostock